Vigra Church is a parish church of the Church of Norway in Haram Municipality in Møre og Romsdal county, Norway. It is the church for the Vigra parish which is part of the Nordre Sunnmøre prosti (deanery) in the Diocese of Møre. The white, wooden church was built in a long church design in 1894 using plans drawn up by the architect Gabriel Smith. The church seats about 500 people.

History
The earliest existing historical records of the church date back to 1432, but the church was not new at that time. The church was possibly built in the 13th century. Very little is known about this old medieval stave church except that it existed until 1756 when it was struck by lightning and burned down. A new timber-framed, cruciform church was constructed on the same site in 1756. Over time, the new church was deemed to be too small, so on 12 December 1890, the parish council voted to build a new church. So, on 7 October 1892, a foundation stone was laid for the new church on the new site. On 24 January 1894, the Bishop Waldemar Hvoslef consecrated the new building for use. The old church building in Roald was torn down in the spring of 1896.

See also
List of churches in Møre

References

Giske
Churches in Møre og Romsdal
Long churches in Norway
Wooden churches in Norway
19th-century Church of Norway church buildings
Churches completed in 1894
13th-century establishments in Norway